Homeward Bound may refer to:

Film and television

Film 
 Homeward Bound (1923 film), an American silent film directed by Ralph Ince
 Homeward Bound (1980 film), a TV film starring Moosie Drier
 Homeward Bound: The Incredible Journey, a 1993 American remake of the 1963 film The Incredible Journey
 Homeward Bound (2002 film), a TV film featuring Jake Richardson

Television

Series 
 Homeward Bound (Australian TV series), a 1958 variety entertainment series
 Homeward Bound (New Zealand TV series), a 1992 soap opera

Episodes 
 "Homeward Bound" (Girls), 2016
 "Homeward Bound" (Private Practice), 2009
 "Homeward Bound" (Roseanne), 1993

Literature 
 Homeward Bound (play), a 1991 play by Elliott Hayes
 Homeward Bound (Turtledove novel), a 2004 Worldwar series novel by Harry Turtledove
 Homeward Bound (Cooper novel), an 1838 novel by James Fenimore Cooper
 Homeward Bound, a 1988 Deathlands novel by Laurence James (as James Axler)

Music
Homeward Bound, a musical project of Australian hip hop artist Jimblah

Albums
Homeward Bound (album), by Harry Belafonte, 1970
Homeward Bound, by Bryn Terfel, 2013
Homeward Bound, by Sabina Ddumba, 2016

Songs
"Homeward Bound" (1917 song), composed by George W. Meyer
"Homeward Bound" (Simon & Garfunkel song), 1966
"Homeward Bound", by Dropkick Murphys from The Gang's All Here, 1999
"Homeward Bound", written by Irving Berlin
"Homeward Bound", by Yelawolf on Mud Mouth
"Homeward Bound", composed by Marta Keen Thompson

Other uses 
 Homeward Bound (horse) (1961–>1982), a British Thoroughbred racehorse
 Homeward Bound (organization), an Australia-based leadership program for women in science
 Homeward Bound, a shelter for domestic-violence victims operated by the Marjaree Mason Center, Fresno, California